Pietra Rivoli is a professor of Finance and International Business at the McDonough School of Business at Georgetown University and author of award-winning book, The Travels of a T-Shirt in the Global Economy.

Biography 
Pietra Rivoli teaches finance and international business in the undergraduate, graduate, and executive programs. Professor Rivoli has special interests in social justice issues in international business and in China, and she regularly leads MBA residencies to China. Her academic research has been published in numerous leading journals, including the Journal of International Business Studies, Business Ethics Quarterly, and Journal of Money Credit and Banking. In 2006, Professor Rivoli was awarded a Faculty Pioneer Award by the Aspen Institute. This award recognizes Business School faculty who have been leaders in the integration of social and environmental issues into MBA curricula.  Professor Rivoli's book, The Travels of a T-shirt in the Global Economy (2005, 2009, 2014), has been widely acclaimed by both the popular press and the academic community as a pathbreaking study of globalization. Professor Rivoli's book has received numerous awards. These honors include being named one of the best business books of the year by the Financial Times, Booz Allen Hamilton, Foreign Affairs, the Library Journal, and by Amazon.com. In addition, the book was also named as a finalist for the Inaugural Financial-Times-Goldman Sachs Book of the Year Award. Finally, Travels of a T-shirt was recently designated by the American Association of Publishers as the best scholarly book of 2005 in the category of Finance and Economics and has been translated into 14 languages.

References

External links

1950s births
Living people
21st-century American economists
American women economists
University of Florida alumni
McDonough School of Business faculty
21st-century American women